Riemer (German and Jewish (Ashkenazic): occupational name for a maker of leather reins and similar articles Middle High German riemære German Riemer Yiddish rime) is a surname. Notable people with the surname include:

Daniel Riemer (born 1986), American politician
Dennis Riemer (born 1988), German footballer
Friedrich Wilhelm Riemer (1774–1845), German scholar and literary historian
Gustav Riemer (1860–1922), American politician
Harold de Riemer Morgan (1888–1964), British Army officer
Isaac De Riemer (1666–1729), American politician
Jeffrey R. Riemer (born 1951), American air force general
Josef Riemer (born 1950), Austrian politician
Julius Riemer (1880–1958), German industrialist and museum collector
Marco Riemer (born 1988), German footballer
Yvon Riemer (born 1970), French wrestler

See also
 Remer (disambiguation)
 Reimers, a surname
Occupational surnames

German-language surnames